Sultanpet may refer to:

 Roman Catholic Diocese of Sultanpet, Palakkad district, Kerala, India
 Sultanpet Block, Coimbatore district, Tamil Nadu, India
 Sultanpet, a neighbourhood in Bangalore, Karnataka, India
 Sultanpet, a village in Nizamabad district, Telangana, India

See also
 Battle of Sultanpet Tope, 1799, during the Fourth Anglo-Mysore War